Douyu is a town of Luancheng District of Shijiazhuang in southwestern Hebei province, China, located  west of the county seat and about the same distance south of Shijiazhuang near the interchange of G20 Qingdao–Yinchuan Expressway with China National Highway 107. In 2011, it had 17 villages under its administration.

See also
List of township-level divisions of Hebei

References

Township-level divisions of Hebei